Chicago has a particularly large Czech population (colloquially known as "Czechcagoans").

History
The First Czechs came to Chicago in 1850s and 1860s, shortly after the Habsburgs crushed the Czech Revolution of 1848 In the Crown Kingdom of Bohemia. Their Slovak counterparts would arrive in the city about 40 years later in the early 20th Century. They called their first settlement in the city, concentrated around Canal, Harrison, and Twelfth Streets, Praha (Prague), where they would establish several Czech institutions. Later, many of them settled in Chicago's Pilsen neighborhood, which was named after Pilsen, Czechia. The first Czech Catholic Church, St Wenceslaus, was founded at De Koven and Des Plaines streets in 1863. America's first daily Czech newspaper Svornost began publication in 1875. Also common in many Czech-American communities was a Sokol (equivalent to a German Turnverein), or a gymnastics facility, which fostered fitness and community bonding, located at Canal and Taylor. After the Great Chicago Fire started in Praha, the Czechs then moved south in an area they called Pilsen, especially after Italians and Greeks started moving into Praha.

Tragedy struck Chicago's Czech American community in 1911, when five-year old Elsie Paroubek was kidnaped and murdered. As a result, the Czech American community mobilized massively to help in the searches for the girl and support her family, and gained much sympathy from the general American public.

Notable Czech Chicagoans
Anton Cermak mayor from 1931 – 1933, born in Kladno, Austria-Hungary
Gene Cernan - American astronaut, naval aviator, electrical engineer, aeronautical engineer, and fighter pilot. born in Chicago, Illinois
Ray Kroc Businessman; He purchased the fast food company McDonald's in 1961 and served as its CEO from 1967 to 1973. Kroc is credited with the global expansion of 'McDonalds'
George Halas, nicknamed "Papa Bear", - American professional football player, coach, and team owner. He was the founder and owner of the National Football League's Chicago Bears, born in Chicago, Illinois
Kim Novak Actress, songwriter and artist. Best Known for the 1958 movie Vertigo., born in Chicago, Illinois
 Milos Stehlik Founder of Facets Multimedia, film distributor, commentator. born in Slany, Czechoslovakia
Judy Baar Topinka former Illinois state treasurer.
Charles Turzak Chicago artist and printmaker.

Institutions
 Chicago Czech American Community Center

References

 
Ethnic groups in Chicago